Chub Pond is a lake located by North Wilmurt, New York. Fish species present in the lake are rock bass, white sucker, yellow perch, pumpkinseed sunfish, and brown bullhead. There is access via trail off Bear Creek Road.

References

Lakes of New York (state)
Lakes of Herkimer County, New York